Holland Hall may refer to

 One of the University of Exeter Halls of Residence
 Holland Hall at the University of Pittsburgh
 Holland Hall (Tulsa, Oklahoma), an independent K-12 school
 Holland Hall Gymnasium, the home basketball court used by Hampton University until 1993

See also 
 Holland House (disambiguation)

Architectural disambiguation pages